Semikarakorsk Fortress was an early medieval Khazar fortification situated near the city of Semikarakorsk (Rostov Oblast, Russia).

History and description 
An early medieval Khazar fortress in Rostov Oblast near the city of Semikarakorsk was built in the late 8th - early 9th century. It was situated on the island hill near Semikarakorsk. The island itself is located at the Sal River.

The fortress was a residence of Khazar Khagans on the Lower Don, and it was four times larger than the  -- a well-known fortress of the same period.

In 1971-1974, archaeological excavations were carried out at the area. It was discovered that the fortress was built according to the "square in square" system, had a wall sized 215 x 200 m and a citadel inside of it measuring 85 x 80 meters. The fortified city also was of great commercial importance.

The fortress and citadel with a total length of six-meter walls almost a kilometer in length was a prominent achievement of the Khazar Khaganate. The walls of the fortress and the citadel were constructed of about 2 million pieces of bricks.

Raw brick of high quality was used as a building material. The dimensions of the bricks were 25 x 25 x 5 cm. The fortress walls have been preserved to the height of up to one meter, and the main tower, the donjon - up to a two-meter height. With the wall thickness of about 2 meters, the maximum height of the walls could reach 5–6 meters. Archaeologists first assumed that the houses inside the fortress were also built of raw brick, but later it turned out that there were houses of burned bricks. Because of this, it is assumed that the fortress was intended to be a residence for the Khagans: since only they lived in brick houses.

In 2011, archaeologists under the leadership of Irina Arzhantseva from the Institute of Anthropology and Ethnography of the Russian Academy of Sciences began studying the site of the fortress.

See also
 Golden Hills (Russia)

References

History of Rostov Oblast
Archaeological sites in Russia
Saltovo-Mayaki culture